, formerly "Science University of Tokyo" or TUS, informally  or simply  is a private research university located in Shinjuku, Tokyo, Japan.

History
Tokyo University of Science was founded in 1881 as The Tokyo Academy of Physics by 21 graduates of the Department of Physics in the Faculty of Science, University of Tokyo (then the Imperial University). In 1883, it was renamed the Tokyo College of Science, and in 1949, it attained university status and became the Tokyo University of Science. The leading character appearing in Japanese novelist Soseki Natsume's novel Botchan graduated from Tokyo University of Science.

, it is the only private university in Japan that has produced a Nobel Prize winner and the only private university in Asia to produce Nobel Prize winners within the natural sciences field.

Academic rankings

Global university rankings
Academic Ranking of World Universities ranked Tokyo University of Science in equal 13th place in Japan.

Graduate school rankings
Eduniversal ranked Tokyo University of Science second in its rankings of "Top business school with significant international influence" in Japan.

Alumni rankings
In Times Higher Education ranking of CEOs of the world's largest enterprises, it is ranked third for Japanese universities.

Campuses
Tokyo University of Science main campus is located in the Kagurazaka district of Shinjuku. The nearest station is Iidabashi Station.

Apart from the main campus in Shinjuku, there are other campuses around the country:
 Kagurazaka (Main) Campus: Shinjuku
 Fujimi school building: Chiyoda-ku, Tokyo
 Katsushika Campus: Katsushika-ku, Tokyo
 Noda Campus: Noda, Chiba
 Oshamambe Campus: Oshamambe, Hokkaido

Facilities

Libraries
Tokyo University of Science has libraries in four different areas: Kagurazaka, Noda, Katsushika and Oshamambe.

 Kagurazaka Library
 Noda Library
 Katsushika Library
 Oshamambe Library

Museum and other facilities

Other libraries on Tokyo University of Science campuses include:

 Science and Technology Museum
 Athletic Facilities
 Seminar House
 Training Center
 Morito Memorial Hall

Undergraduate and graduate schools

Undergraduate schools
Science Division I
Engineering
Pharmaceutical Sciences
Science and Technology
Industrial Science and Technology
Management
Science Division II

Graduate schools
Science
Chemical Sciences and Technology
Mathematics and Science Education
Engineering
Pharmaceutical Sciences
Science and Technology
Industrial Science and Technology
Management
Biological Sciences
Innovation Studies
Global Fire Science and Technology

Professional graduate schools
Management of Science and Technology (MOT)
Master of Intellectual Property (MIP)

Special Training Course for Teachers
Division of Mathematics

Research institutes
University Research Administration Center
Planning and Management Division
Research Strategy Formulation Division
Research & Industry University Cooperation Supporting Division
Regional Alliance & Commercialization Promotion Division
Research Institute for Science and Technology
Research Centers
Center for Fire Science and Technology
IR FEL Research Center
Research Center for Chirality
Photocatalysis International Research Center
Translational Research Center
Imaging Frontier Center
Water Frontier Science & Technology Research Center
Research Center for Space Colony
Research Divisions
Division of Pharmaco-creation Frontier
Division of Integrated Science of Oshamambe town
Division of Advanced Communication Researches
International Research Division of Interfacial Thermo-fluid Dynamics
Division of Nanocarbon Research
Division of Bio-organometallics
Division of Thermoelectrics for Waste Heat Recovery
Division of Colloid and Interface Science
Division of Synergetic Supramolecular Coordination Systems in Multiphase
Division of Advanced Urbanism and Architecture
Academic Detailing Database Division
Division of Medical-Science-Engineering Cooperation
Division of Mathematical Modeling and its Mathematical Analysis
Water Frontier Science Research Division
Fusion of Regenerative Medicine with DDS
Photovoltaic Science and Technology Research Division
Advanced EC Device Research Division
Division of Agri-biotechnology
Division of Things and Systems
Atmospheric Science Research Division
Division of Super Distributed Intelligent Systems
Brain Interdisciplinary Research Division
Division of Intelligent System Engineering
Advanced Agricultural Energy Science and Technology Research Division
Joint Usage / Research Center
Research Center for Fire Safety Science
Photocatalysis International Research Center
Research Institute for Biomedical Sciences
Research Institute Division Groups
Division of Immunobiology
Division of Molecular Biology
Division of Biosignaling
Division of Molecular Pathology
Division of Development and Aging
Division of Experimental Animal Immunology
Division of Clinical Research
Division of Intramural Cooperation
Division of Extramural Cooperation	
Research Equipment Center
Center for Data Science

Academic exchange agreements overseas
As of 2016, Tokyo University of Science had academic exchange agreements with 75 overseas universities and research institutions, including those between departments and departments.

Affiliated schools
The university has two affiliated four-year universities: Tokyo University of Science, Yamaguchi, in Sanyo-Onoda, Yamaguchi, and Tokyo University of Science, Suwa, in Chino, Nagano.

Principals, presidents, and chairmen

Principals
 Hisashi Terao, 1883-1896
 Kiyoo Nakamura, 1896–1930
 Kyohei Nakamura, 1930–1934
 Masatoshi Ōkōchi, 1934–1945
 Nakagoro Hirakawa, 1945–1949
 Kotaro Honda, 1949–1951
Concurrently appointed president of Tokyo University of Science.

Presidents
 Kotaro Honda, 1949–1953
 Masaichi Majima, 1955-1966
 Seishi Kikuchi, 1966-1970
 Masao Kotani, 1970-1982
 Masao Yoshiki, 1982-1990
 Tetsuji Nishikawa, 1990-2001
 Hiroyuki Okamura, 2002-2005
 Shin Takeuchi, 2006-2009
 Akira Fujishima, 2010-2018, discoverer of photocatalyst
 Yoichiro Matsumoto, 2018-

Chairmen
 Kotaro Honda, 1951–1953
 Nakagoro Hirakawa, 1953-1978
 Shigeyoshi Kittaka, 1978-1997
 Sanjiro Sakabe, 1997-1999
 Nobuyuki Koura, 1999-2002
 Takeyo Tsukamoto, 2002-2012
 Shigeru Nakane, 2012-2015
 Kazuo Motoyama, 2015-

Notable faculty
 Makoto Asashima, Vice President, discoverer of activin
 Michael A. Cusumano, business administration, vice president, Massachusetts Institute of Technology professor
 Chiaki Mukai, JAXA astronaut, Vice President
 Teruaki Mukaiyama, chemist, former professor, discoverer of Mukaiyama aldol addition
 Kensō Soai, chemist, professor, discoverer of Soai reaction
 Jaw-Shen Tsai, physicist, professor
 Noriaki Kano, professor emeritus
 Kazunori Kataoka, former professor, Humboldt Prize winner
 Norio Taniguchi, former professor, Proponent of Nanotechnology

Notable alumni

Nobel prize laureates
 Satoshi Ōmura, biochemist, 2015 Nobel Prize in Physiology or Medicine winner

Government
Shigeru Yoshida, Prime Minister, (Attended University 1896 but dropped out)

Business
 Kazuo Motoyama, President of Asahi Soft Drinks, 2013-2015, Chairman of TUS 2015-
 Philip M. Condit, CEO of Boeing, 1996-2003
 Toshihiro Suzuki, CEO of Suzuki, 2016-
 Seiichi Sudo, Vice President of Toyota, 2013-2016
 Tatsuya Tanaka, President of Fujitsu, 2015-
 Shigeki Tanaka, President of Clariant Japan, 2016-
 Masahiro Inoue, CEO of Yahoo! Japan, 1996-2012
 Shigeru Nakane, CEO of SAP Japan, 1993-1999
 Shiinoki Shigeru, Vice President of Oracle Japan, 2013-2016
 Zenji Miura, CEO of Ricoh, 2013-
 Fumikathu Tokiwa, Kao Corporation Chairman. 1997-2000
 Shuhei Nakamoto, Honda Racing Corporation Vice President, Repsol Honda representative
 Takanobu Satō, President of Shinchosha. 1996-

Academia
 Jin Akiyama, mathematician, professor
 Isamu Shiina, professor, discoverer of 2-Methyl-6-nitrobenzoic anhydride, Shiina macrolactonization and Shiina esterification
 Yasuhiko Kojima, virologist, discoverer of Interferon
 Tetsuo Asakura, professor, developer of artificial blood vessels using silk
 Tashpolat Tiyip, president of Xinjiang University

Architecture
 Kazuo Shinohara, architect, Venice Biennale awarded a special commemorative Golden Lion
 Hideto Horiike, architect, Visiting Professor of the University of California, Los Angeles, Visiting Professor of the Massachusetts Institute of Technology

Media
 Tsuyoshi Muro, actor, (attended university but dropped out)

Others
 Masayoshi Soken, sound editor
 Hirokazu Yasuhara, video game designer
 Shigeru Nakanishi, artist
 Ryu Ota (1930–2009), politician
 Fushigi Yamada (born 1959), voice actress
 Hiroshi Sakurazaka, author
 Akihiro Murayama, mixed martial artist

See also
TSUBAME (satellite)

References

External links
 

 
Educational institutions established in 1881
Private universities and colleges in Japan
1881 establishments in Japan
Universities and colleges in Tokyo